Otto Sydow (1 February 1896 – 24 June 1970) was a highly decorated Generalmajor in the Luftwaffe during World War II. He was also a recipient of the Knight's Cross of the Iron Cross. The Knight's Cross of the Iron Cross was awarded to recognise extreme battlefield bravery or successful military leadership. Otto Sydow was captured by Soviet troops in May 1945 and was held until October 1955.

Awards and decorations
 Wound Badge (1914)
 in Black (9 July 1918)
 Iron Cross (1914)
 2nd Class (7 March 1917)
 Cross of Honor
 Sudetenland Medal with "Prague Castle Bar"
 Iron Cross (1939)
 2nd Class (4 December 1940)
 1st Class (25 August 1941)
 Anti-Aircraft Flak Battle Badge (12 December 1941)
 Eastern Front Medal
 German Cross in Gold (24 September 1942)
 Knight's Cross of the Iron Cross on 28 February 1945 as Generalmajor and commander of 1. Flak-Division Berlin

References

Citations

Bibliography

External links
TracesOfWar.com

1896 births
1970 deaths
People from Altentreptow
German Army personnel of World War I
Luftwaffe World War II generals
Recipients of the clasp to the Iron Cross, 2nd class
Recipients of the Gold German Cross
Recipients of the Knight's Cross of the Iron Cross
German prisoners of war in World War II held by the Soviet Union
German police officers
People from the Province of Pomerania
Major generals of the Luftwaffe
Military personnel from Mecklenburg-Western Pomerania